Orthocentrinae is a subfamily of ichneumon wasps in the family Ichneumonidae. There are about six genera in Orthocentrinae.

Genera
These six genera belong to the subfamily Orthocentrinae:
 Aperileptus Förster, 1869 c g b
 Eusterinx Förster, 1869 c g b
 Neurateles Ratzeburg, 1848 c g b
 Orthocentrus Gravenhorst, 1829 c g b
 Proclitus Förster, 1869 c g b
 Stenomacrus Förster, 1869 c g b
Data sources: i = ITIS, c = Catalogue of Life, g = GBIF, b = Bugguide.net

References

Further reading

External links

 

Parasitic wasps
Ichneumonidae
Apocrita subfamilies